= Century China =

- Website type: Liberal intellectual website
- Founded: July 19, 2000
- Dissolved: July 25, 2006
- Website: www.cc.org.cn

Century China was a Mainland China-based liberal intellectual website founded on July 19, 2000, focusing on humanistic thought and social sciences.

Century China was once the most influential intellectual website in China. It was organized by the Beijing Zhongqing Future Community Culture Development Research Institute and co-organized by the Institute of Chinese Culture of the Chinese University of Hong Kong.

Century China had the mission of "building a rational and open public space for speech", and its central doctrine was to be "free, independent, democratic, tolerant and rational".

On July 25, 2006, it was shut down by the Communication Administration Bureau of Beijing.
